Rorschach railway station is a railway station in Rorschach, in the Swiss canton of St. Gallen. It sits at the junction of four railway lines: Chur–Rorschach, Rorschach–St. Gallen, Rorschach–Heiden, and the Lake Line. It is the primary station for Rorschach and is served by local and long-distance trains.

Rorschach is one of three stations within the municipality of Rorschach, along with Rorschach Stadt (the next station west on the Rorschach–St. Gallen line) and Rorschach Hafen, the next station northwest on the Rorschach–Heiden line on the shore of Lake Constance.

Services 
 the following services stop at Rorschach:

 St. Gallen S-Bahn:
 : half-hourly service to Romanshorn and hourly service to Weinfelden; on Saturdays and Sundays, service every two hours to  via .
 : hourly service between Rorschach Hafen and Heiden.

References

External links 
 
 

Railway stations in the canton of St. Gallen
Swiss Federal Railways stations
Rorschach, Switzerland